Ronald Andrew Sedlbauer (born October 22, 1954) is a former professional ice hockey left winger who played seven seasons in the National Hockey League.

Hockey career
Sedlbauer was drafted 23rd overall by the Vancouver Canucks in the 1974 NHL amateur draft. He played 430 career NHL games, scoring 143 goals and 86 assists for 229 points. He also shares the modern-day record, along with Rick Nash, for fewest assists in a 40+ goal season. Sedlbauer scored 40 goals in the 1978–79 season, but only registered 16 assists. He held the record for 26 seasons until Nash tied it in the 2003–04 NHL season by scoring 41 goals and only 16 assists.

Life
Ron attended Burlington Central High School from 1968 to 1972. He was a member of the Halton junior football championship team in 1971. Ron also qualified for the O.F.S.A.A. track and field championships in the shot put event. Ron was thrilled to receive an honorary athletic letter from the school the year he graduated.

Ron spent most of his youth playing hockey for the City of Burlington. He was drafted by the Hamilton Red Wings Jr. A hockey club while a member of the Burlington midget city rep team. After two and a half years with Hamilton, Ron was traded to the Kitchener Rangers, where he scored his only Jr. A hat trick; during his last game in junior; on his last ever shift.

Ron now lives in Burlington with his wife Sue, and his son, Brendon. He is currently the vice-president of Cougar Shoes Inc., and president of the Burlington Cougars Jr. A hockey club.

Career statistics

Highlights
1971 Drafted by Hamilton Red Wings Jr. A Hockey Club
1974 OHA (Jr. A) Regular Season Champions – Kitchener Rangers
1974 Drafted by Vancouver Canucks as their 1st pick, and 23rd overall in the NHL
1975 Scored 1st NHL goal versus Toronto Maple Leafs.
1974-75 Smythe Division Champions with Vancouver Canucks
1979 Set a new Vancouver Canuck single season goal scoring record of 40 goals.
1979 Won the Cyrus McLean Trophy as Vancouver Canucks leading scorer
1979 Scored 100th N.H.L. goal versus Toronto Maple Leafs
1979-80 Smythe Division Champions with Chicago Blackhawks
2004 Honoured as one of Hamilton's Hometown hockey heroes
2005 Selected to the Burlington Central High School Athletic Hall of Fame

References

External links

1954 births
Living people
Canadian ice hockey left wingers
Chicago Blackhawks players
Cincinnati Tigers players
Hamilton Red Wings (OHA) players
Kitchener Rangers players
Seattle Totems (CHL) players
Toronto Maple Leafs players
Toronto Toros draft picks
Tulsa Oilers (1964–1984) players
Vancouver Canucks draft picks
Vancouver Canucks players
Ice hockey people from Ontario
Sportspeople from Burlington, Ontario
Canadian expatriate ice hockey players in the United States